Quinn Duffy (born January 1, 1970) is an American actor. He has had major roles in such films as The Chaos Experiment (a.k.a. The Steam Experiment), Game of Death, and Green Book, and has guest-starred in numerous television shows. He wrote, directed, and produced the 2005 short film The Ledge.

Filmography

Film

Television

References

External links
 Official website
 

1970 births
Living people
American male actors
Place of birth missing (living people)